John Gallus is a Republican former member of the New Hampshire Senate, representing the 1st District from 2002 to 2012. Previously he was a member of the New Hampshire House of Representatives from 1996 until 2002.

External links
Re-Elect Senator John Gallus Web Page official website
The New Hampshire Senate - Senator John Gallus official NH Senate website
Project Vote Smart - Senator John Gallus (NH) profile
Follow the Money - John Gallus
2006 2004 2002 2000 1998 campaign contributions

Republican Party New Hampshire state senators
Republican Party members of the New Hampshire House of Representatives
Living people
Year of birth missing (living people)